Taekwondo made its debut at the 1987 Pan American Games.

Medal table

Men's events

References

Pan American Games
Events at the 1987 Pan American Games
Taekwondo at the Pan American Games